Coelanthum is a genus of flowering plants belonging to the family Molluginaceae.

Its native range is Southern Africa.

Species:

Coelanthum grandiflorum 
Coelanthum semiquinquefidum 
Coelanthum verticillatum

References

Molluginaceae
Caryophyllales genera